Joel Polis (born October 3, 1951) is an American television, film and stage actor.

Polis has appeared in over one hundred television programs and films during his career.

Career
Polis' first film role was the character Fuchs in the 1982 science fiction film The Thing. He appeared in numerous television series including Cheers, Alien Nation, Northern Exposure, Star Trek: Voyager, Roseanne, Seinfeld, Chicago Hope, Boston Legal and CSI. He appeared in a recurring role on the television series Cheers as the mischievous Gary, owner of the rival bar, Gary's Olde Towne Tavern.

Polis's theater credits include performances at the Astor Place Theatre, Hartford Stage, Old Globe Theater, South Coast Repertory, Mark Taper Forum, Odyssey Theatre, Laguna Playhouse, Lillian Theater and the Pasadena Playhouse. He was a guest on NCIS

Filmography

Film

Television

References

External links
 
 

1951 births
Living people
Male actors from Philadelphia
American male film actors
American male stage actors
American male television actors
Identical twins
University of Southern California alumni
Yale School of Drama alumni
American twins
20th-century American male actors
21st-century American male actors
Jewish American male actors
21st-century American Jews